Deh-e Karam or Dehkaram may refer to:
 Dehkaram, Isfahan
 Deh-e Karam, Sistan and Baluchestan
 Deh-e Karam Mazraeh, Sistan and Baluchestan Province